Israel participated in the 1964 Summer Paralympics in Tokyo. 20 Israeli athletes won seven gold medals, three silver and eleven bronze, enabling their country to finish 7th on the medal table.

Delegation
The Israeli delegation was composed of ten IDF veterans and ten athletes of the Israel Sports Center for the Disabled. Other excelling athletes were banned from participating due to indecent behavior. The delegation was headed by Mr. Arieh Fink, head of the rehabilitation department of the Israel Ministry of Defense, and accompanied by Mr. Gershon Huberman, director of the Israel Sports Center for the Disabled. Further members of the delegation were basketball coaches Shimon Shelah and Jacob Hendelsman, Mrs. Edna Medalia and two medical nurses.

In the 1964 Summer Paralympic Games, Israel participated for the first time in the weightlifting field, following Shalom Dalugatch's achievement of criteria by breaking the previous Paralympics' record. Delegation member Israel Even-Sahav was the sole athlete, of all participating states, asked to take part in rehearsals to the opening ceremony.

The delegation's travel expenses were divided in accordance with its composition: The IDF veterans were sponsored by the Ministry of Defense, sports organizations, the Olympic Committee and the athletes themselves, while the Center's athletes were sponsored by Japanese parties, most prominently by businessman Saul Eisenberg.

The eldest member of the delegation was Michael Ben-Naftali (40) and the youngest Jacob Ben-Arie (14). Israel was ranked 7th on the medal table, winning seven gold medals, three silver and 11 bronze and achieving three world records.

The wrong reports

Since at the dawn of the Paralympic Games there was no precision in reporting the results of the competitions, the Israeli athlete Michal Escapa was indicated with the Italian nationality and without prename (and so she is mentioned in the International Paralympic Committee of the Italian Paralympic Committee web sites) for the reports of the Swimming at the 1964 Summer Paralympics where she won two bronze medals, simply reported as Escapa and not as Michal Escapa. However, as can be seen from a 1968 Israeli newspaper reporting an interview with the athlete, she was the same athlete who had won medals in swimming and table tennis in Tokyo 1964.

Medalists

Athletes
IDF veterans:

 Michael Ben-Naftali
 Shmuel Ben-Zakai
 Zvi Ben-Zvi
 Reuven Hebron
 Simcha Lustig
 Menachem Morba
 Avraham Mushraki
 Joseph Sharav
 Yoel Singer
 Dan Wagner

Israel Sports Center for the Disabled representatives:

 Jacob Ben-Arie
 Shalom Dalugatch
 Michal Escapa
 Israel Even-Sahav
 Yitzhak Galitzki
 Israel Globus
 Baruch Hagai
 Avraham Keftelovich
 Batia Mishani
 Zipora Rosenbaum

References

External links
International Paralympic Committee
Israeli Paralympic Committee

Nations at the 1964 Summer Paralympics
1964
Paralympics